Clayton, West Yorkshire contains the civil parish of Clayton and the ward of Clayton and Fairweather Green in the metropolitan borough of the City of Bradford, West Yorkshire, England.  The parish and ward contain 68 listed buildings that are recorded in the National Heritage List for England. All the listed buildings are designated at Grade II, the lowest of the three grades, which is applied to "buildings of national importance and special interest".  The parish and ward contain the village of Clayton and the surrounding area.  It is largely residential, and the area to the west of the village is rural.  Most of the listed buildings are houses, cottages and associated structures, farmhouses and farm buildings.  The other listed buildings include two churches, a public house, a former workhouse, two schools, a village hall, and the chimney of a former factory.


Buildings

References

Citations

Sources

 

Lists of listed buildings in West Yorkshire